Neblinichthys roraima is a species of catfish in the family Loricariidae. It is native to South America, where it occurs in the Kukenan River basin in the Caroní River drainage in Venezuela. It is known to inhabit creeks devoid of aquatic vegetation with a substrate composed of stones and sand, at an elevation of 1200 to 1400 m (3937 to 4593 ft). The species reaches 5.1 cm (2 inches) SL.

References 

Ancistrini
Fish described in 1995